The South Coast Daylight Express was a limited stops passenger train operated by the New South Wales Government Railways and its successors between Sydney and Bomaderry from 1933 until January 1991.

History
After departing Sydney Central it travelled via the Illawarra line calling at Hurstville, Wollongong, Kiama, Gerringong, Berry and Bomaderry. It continued to operate after the line was electrified to Wollongong in January 1986 but was withdrawn in January 1991 with DEB set railcars connecting with V set electrics at Wollongong.

Rolling stock
It was originally formed of R set carriages painted green and cream. From 1949 until 1957 it was formed of air-conditioned HUB carriages.

In March 1961, the 1100 class Budd diesel railcars took over. From the late 1970s they were joined by the 1200 class Tulloch diesel railcars. Following a derailment at Erskineville in February 1983, they began to have their engines removed and became locomotive hauled stock with a 44, 421 or 422 class diesel usually hauling the sets. At various times DEB railcar, HUB and RUB stock operated the service.

References

Named passenger trains of New South Wales
Passenger rail transport in New South Wales
Railway services introduced in 1933
Railway services discontinued in 1991
1933 establishments in Australia
1991 disestablishments in Australia
Discontinued railway services in Australia